Willie Horne (23 January 1922 – 23 March 2001) was an English rugby league footballer of the 1940s and '50s. He played for Great Britain, England, Lancashire and Barrow between 1943 and 1959 and captained all four sides as a round the corner style goal-kicking . He captained Great Britain in a test series against Australia (1952). In October 2014 he was inducted into the Rugby League Hall of Fame, and is therefore regarded as one of the best 23 players in the history of the British game.

Early life
Willie Horne as born on 23 January 1922 in Barrow-in-Furness, Lancashire, England. He played rugby league football and appeared in two games on trial with Oldham R.L.F.C., but turned down the opportunity to join the club, signing for his home town side Barrow instead in 1943.

Playing career
Whilst playing for Barrow Horne was selected to go on the 1946 Great Britain Lions tour.

Horne played  in Barrow's 0–10 defeat by Wigan in the 1951 Challenge Cup Final during the 1950–51 season at Wembley Stadium, London on Saturday 5 May 1951, Horne was the 1951–52 Northern Rugby Football League season's top point scorer. Horne played . Horne was the 1951–52 Northern Rugby Football League season's top point scorer.  Horne played , and was captain in Barrow's 12–2 victory over Oldham in the 1954 Lancashire County Cup Final during the 1954–55 season at Station Road, Swinton on Saturday 23 October 1954. Horne also represented Great Britain while at Barrow between 1952 and 1956 against France (1 non-Test match). Horne's Testimonial match for Barrow took place in 1955. Horne played , and was captain in the 21-12 victory over Workington Town in the 1955 Challenge Cup Final during the 1954–55 season at Wembley Stadium, London on Saturday 30 April 1955, in front of a crowd of 66,513.

Horne played in Barrow's 7-9 defeat by Leeds in the 1957 Challenge Cup Final during the 1956–57 season at Wembley Stadium, London on Saturday 11 May 1957, in front of a crowd of 76,318. Horne set new records for Barrow's "Most Career Points" with 1,818, and is ninth in Barrow's all time try scorers list with 112-tries.

Post-playing
Horne was inducted into the Barrow club's Hall of Fame when it was launched in 2001 alongside 1950s teammates Phil Jackson and Jimmy Lewthwaite. Horne died on 23 March 2001 aged 79 at his home in Barrow-in-Furness, Cumbria, England and a statue of him now stands opposite Craven Park, the home of Barrow. This statue in Memory of Willie is sited in 'gardens' between Duke Street and Howard Street, in front of College House, Barrow-in-Furness.

In 2014 Horne was inducted into the Rugby Football League Hall of Fame.

References

External links
Back on the Wembley trail
 

1922 births
2001 deaths
Rugby league players from Barrow-in-Furness
English rugby league players
Rugby league five-eighths
Oldham R.L.F.C. players
Barrow Raiders players
Barrow Raiders captains
Lancashire rugby league team players
England national rugby league team players
Great Britain national rugby league team captains
Great Britain national rugby league team players